William McKie Muir (born 6 May 1934) was a Scottish footballer who played for Kilmarnock, Clyde,  Queen of the South, Ayr United and Dumbarton.

References

1934 births
Scottish footballers
Dumbarton F.C. players
Kilmarnock F.C. players
Clyde F.C. players
Queen of the South F.C. players
Ayr United F.C. players
Scottish Football League players
Living people
Association football forwards